Emrah is a Turkish masculine given name. It is the Turkish spelling which originates from the Arabic word Imrah (Arabic: اِمْرَة) in the feminine form, generally meaning "right to act in a specific way" but also could mean 'power, influence, authority, command.

It is not to be confused with the Biblical figure Imrah. 

People named Emrah include:

 Emrah Başsan (born 1992), Turkish footballer
 Emrah Cebeci (born 1989), Turkish footballer
 Emrah Eren (born 1978), Turkish footballer
 Emrah İpek (born 1971), Turkish pop singer
 Emrah Kiraz (born 1987), Turkish footballer
 Emrah Kuş (born 1988), Turkish Greco-Roman wrestler
 Emrah Yucel (born 1968), Turkish artist

Turkish masculine given names